Bengshan is a district of the city of Bengbu, Anhui Province, China.

Administrative divisions
Nowadays, Bengshan District is divided to 5 subdistricts and 2 townships.
5 Subdistricts:
 Tianqiao
 Qingnian
 Wei'erlu
 Huangzhuang
 Hongyecun
2 Townships:
 Xuehua
 Yanshan

References

External links

Bengbu